Judy Kaye (born October 11, 1948) is an American singer and actress. She has appeared in stage musicals, plays, and operas.  Kaye has been in long runs on Broadway in the musicals The Phantom of the Opera, Ragtime, Mamma Mia!, and (in a second Tony award-winning role) Nice Work If You Can Get It.

Early life
Kaye was born in Phoenix, Arizona, the daughter of Shirley Edith (née Silverman) and Jerome Joseph Kaye, a physician. She attended UCLA, studying drama and voice. "Her voice spans three octaves. She started out as a mezzo and now sings all the way up to an E natural...but basically she feels she is now a soprano." She "easily shifts between Broadway belt and soaring soprano" according to Playbill.com.

Career
Kaye made her Broadway debut as a replacement Rizzo in the original company of Grease in the 1970s. Her next show was the Broadway musical On the Twentieth Century (1978), playing only the small role of the maid Agnes, and also the understudy for leading lady Madeline Kahn. Kahn left the show early in the run, and Kaye took over the lead role. The New York Times reported "Judy Kaye replaced Madeline Kahn...and bang, boom, overnight she is a star." Kaye also toured the US in the musical.

Her next two Broadway ventures flopped. The Moony Shapiro Songbook (1981), a campy spoof of songwriter-based revues like Side by Side by Sondheim and Ain't Misbehavin', closed after fifteen previews and one official performance. Frank Rich, in his New York Times review, wrote "Two members of the company suggest what might have been - Judy Kaye, a skilled musical-comedy comedienne who sings a pretty ballad at a white piano." In November 1981 Oh, Brother!, which transplanted William Shakespeare's The Comedy of Errors to the Middle East, closed after thirteen previews and three official performances. Frank Rich's New York Times review noted that "Judy Kaye, while getting campier each time out, remains a big belter with a sure comic sense."

She was featured in the 1987 concert version of the rarely produced musical Magdalena.  In 1988, Kaye returned to Broadway as Carlotta in The Phantom of the Opera, She won the 1988 Tony Award for Best Featured Actress in a Musical for this role.

It was nearly a decade before her next Broadway role, appearing as Emma Goldman in Ragtime from 1997 to 2000. She was the only principal to remain with that show for its entire run, where she showcased her remarkable range as she sang the Goldman alto part while hitting the B5 high note in the opening prologue. Next, she appeared as "Rosie" in Mamma Mia! in 2001–2003, and received a Tony Award nomination as Best Featured Actress in a Musical.

Kaye has performed extensively in regional theatre, in roles as widely varied as both Julie Jordan and Nettie Fowler in Carousel, Annie Oakley in Annie Get Your Gun, Nellie Forbush in South Pacific, Meg in Brigadoon, Hildy in On the Town, Lalume in Kismet, Lili Vanessi in Kiss Me, Kate, Pistache in Can-Can, Babe Williams in The Pajama Game, the Old Lady in Candide, Maria in The Sound of Music, Rose in Gypsy, Anna in The Anastasia Game, Aldonza in Man of La Mancha, Lucy in You're a Good Man, Charlie Brown, Sally in Follies (1995, Theatre Under the Stars), Mary Magdalene in Jesus Christ Superstar.

Kaye's non-musical roles have included such classics as The Man Who Came to Dinner and You Can't Take It with You (1996, Connecticut Repertory Theatre, Storrs). In 1996 she performed in The Royal Family at the McCarter Theater in Princeton, New Jersey as Kitty Dean. She appeared in Lost in Yonkers in 2011 as Grandma Kurnitz at the Arizona Theatre Company, Phoenix, Arizona.

Kaye appeared in Stephen Temperley's Souvenir and "drew raves for her humorous, yet touching work" with her portrayal of the legendarily bad singer Florence Foster Jenkins. The play originally ran Off-Broadway in November 2004 to January 2005. After a production at the Berkshire Theatre Festival in August to September 2005, it premiered on Broadway, from October 2005 to January 2006, and she has since performed it in several venues in the United States. Ben Brantley, in his New York Times review, wrote: "Ms. Kaye strikes that single note of personality with a happy mixture of ardor, unblinking obliviousness and ... pitch-perfect period detail."

In June 2006, Kaye assumed the role of Mrs. Lovett in Sweeney Todd on Broadway for one week during Patti LuPone's vacation.  She returned in August 2006, when LuPone left for a week to play "Rose" in Gypsy.  She went on to play Mrs. Lovett in the 2007–2008 North American Tour of Sweeney Todd.  The Curtain Up review of that tour in Los Angeles praised Kaye, stating: "There's humor in this production ... Much of that is due to Kaye's impeccable timing, the delicacy of her yearning and her way with a tuba." Kaye had previously played Mrs. Lovett in the Paper Mill Playhouse production of Sweeney in 1991. The New York Times reviewer wrote of her performance there, "it's going to be tough to come up with a Todd and a Mrs. Lovett comparable to George Hearn and Judy Kaye. ... Ms. Kaye's voluptuous voice taps and illuminates musical treasures. The ribaldry, seductiveness and wit of her performance appear thoroughly rooted in Mrs. Lovett's love for Todd."

The musical Paradise Found featured Kaye in a production co-directed by Harold Prince and Susan Stroman at the Menier Chocolate Factory in London from May – June 2010. She appeared in the musical adaption of Tales of the City at the American Conservatory Theater, San Francisco, California, from May through July 2011, as Anna Madrigal.

She starred in the musical Nice Work If You Can Get It, which opened on Broadway in April 2012. She won the Tony Award, Drama Desk Award and Outer Critics Circle Award for this role. In September 2014, she joined the Broadway production of Cinderella as the Fairy Godmother and remained with the show till its final performance on January 3, 2015.

From February to October 2016, Kaye performed the role of Madame Morrible in the Broadway production of Wicked. She then took over the role of the Dowager Empress in the Broadway production of Anastasia from September 2018 through January 2019.

On November 17, 2021, Kaye opened in the Broadway production of Diana,The Musical at the Longacre Theater. She plays the roles of Queen Elizabeth II and the novelist Barbara Cartland, who was Princess Diana's step-grandmother.

Opera, operetta, and recordings
She has performed frequently in opera, operetta and older musicals, including leading roles in: The Beggar's Opera, Orpheus in the Underworld, Leave It to Jane, Oh, Lady! Lady!!, The Cat and the Fiddle, and Trouble in Tahiti. She appeared in concert at The Town Hall, New York, in Eileen and Sweethearts (1983) and Sweet Adeline (1985).

In August 1990 she played Musetta in the Santa Fe Opera production of La Bohème. She debuted the role of Abbie in the premiere of composer Edward Thomas' musical version of Eugene O'Neill's Desire Under the Elms, presented by the New York Opera Repertory Theater in 1989. She performed the title role in The Merry Widow at the Paper Mill Playhouse (Millburn, New Jersey) in 1991. She has appeared with opera companies and orchestras such as the Santa Fe Opera (1985 and 1990), the New York City Opera (1989), the New York Philharmonic (1990), the Boston Pops Orchestra (1990), and the London Symphony Orchestra (1990).

Kaye has made several recordings, including Where, Oh, Where?: Rare Songs of the American Theater (Premier), Diva to Diva (Varèse Sarabande), which focus on musical theatre and "great musical theatre women", and Judy Kaye: Songs From The Silver Screen (Varèse Sarabande), saluting women singing in movie musicals. Two other CDs partner her with the baritone William Sharp, one an all-George Gershwin program, the other all-Leonard Bernstein; the latter includes the world-premiere recording of Bernstein's Arias and Barcarolles.

Kaye is featured on six tracks of John McGlinn's EMI disc Broadway Showstoppers, four of them numbers from Jerome Kern's Sweet Adeline (including the ballad "Why Was I Born?") and one a first-ever recording of the "Duet for One (The First Lady of the Land)", the tour-de-force from Leonard Bernstein and Alan Jay Lerner's 1600 Pennsylvania Avenue. She was featured on the 1997 Varèse Sarabande studio recording of the 1965 musical Drat! The Cat!

Kinsey Millhone books
Kaye reads the audiobooks of Sue Grafton's Kinsey Millhone series.

Personal life
Kaye lives in New Jersey with her husband, David Green, in an apartment overlooking Manhattan.

Awards and nominations

References

External links
 
 
 Judy Kaye - Downstage Center interview at the American Theatre Wing
  (archive)

1948 births
Living people
American musical theatre actresses
American sopranos
American voice actresses
Audiobook narrators
Tony Award winners
20th-century American actresses
Actresses from Phoenix, Arizona
Drama Desk Award winners
UCLA Film School alumni
21st-century American actresses
American television actresses